The Estonia national handball team is controlled by the Estonian Handball Association (Eesti Käsipalliliit) and represents Estonia in international handball competitions.

Honours
Challenge Trophy
 Runners-up: 2001

Competitive record

Olympic Games

World Championship

European Championship

Emerging Nations Championship
2015 – 5th place

Team

Current squad
Squad for the 2019 World Men's Handball Championship qualification.

Head coach: Rein Suvi

Notable players
Dener Jaanimaa
Kaupo Palmar
Mait Patrail

References

External links

IHF profile

Men's national handball teams
Handball
Handball in Estonia